Ravenloft: Strahd's Possession is a 1994 fantasy role-playing video game developed by DreamForge Intertainment for Strategic Simulations for DOS. Ravenloft: Stone Prophet is a sequel to this game.

Plot
The game is based on the Ravenloft campaign setting for the Dungeons & Dragons fantasy role-playing game. The game is set in the domain of Barovia.

The player characters are servants of the Lord Dhelt, leader of the land of Elturel. After an assassin assaults the Lord and steals his Holy Symbol of Helm, the PCs are sent in pursuit of the thief. Instead of catching the criminals, however, they somehow manage to transport the entire party to the mist-shrouded land of Barovia, ruled over by the vampire Count, Strahd von Zarovich.

As Barovia is surrounded by an impenetrable poison mist, the PCs have no choice but to explore the dark land of Barovia, which is crawling with undead and many more nasty things. Strahd, himself, seems interested in the characters' quest for the stolen amulet and invites the party to his castle. The characters' quest is to survive this hostile land long enough to unravel the mystery of the stolen amulet and somehow arrange safe passage out of Barovia.

Gameplay

The game used 3D computer graphics and used a game engine identical to the later SSI title Menzoberranzan. Generally, the keyboard or mouse-driven directional arrows were used to move around or change perspective. As an early 3D game engine, it moved slowly and could appear cumbersome. However, there was an omnipresent map in the top corner which helped gamers from becoming too disoriented by the slow and cluttered progress of the game.

The fighting system involved using the mouse to pinpoint enemies and click to attack, at which point party members would take turns attacking. This unique combat system presented some logistical problems for gamers, and seemed to involve quite a learning curve.

A review in Game Bytes Magazine said: "Characters with weapons in hand will use them one by one [...] However, since the characters have a go one at a time from left to right, and they take a varying amount of time to ready their weapon again after using it, depending on their dexterity, one often finds that characters who are ready to use their weapons cannot do so because the computer is waiting for the character whose turn it is to ready and use his weapons before going to the next one. Hence, one may be anxiously clicking away but no one is using their weapons."

Sound
Voice acting was used in some versions of the game and the Eastern European accent of the central characters did much to improve its believability. The acting was generally well received. But, in the case of Strahd, as Game Bytes Magazine stated "The attempt to make him sound suave yet menacing (which is as it should be) didn't quite come off."

The music of Strahd's Possession was highly atmospheric and was critically acknowledged as a vast improvement of SSI's previous offerings. Game Bytes Magazine said "The music superbly brings out the mood and atmosphere, and is reminiscent of those found in gothic horror movies, with the organ being the central instrument."

Publication history
This game was later included in the 1996 compilation set, the AD&D Masterpiece Collection. On October 27, 2015, the game was re-released on GOG.com with support for Microsoft Windows, OS X, and Linux pre-packed with DOSBox, bundled with the sequel.

Reception

In PC Gamer US, T. Liam McDonald wrote that Strahd's Possession was "one of SSI's best AD&D-based releases, packed with character, featuring just enough novelty, and being very nicely put together." Barry Brenesal of Electronic Entertainment called it "a strong step forward for SSI's epic role-playing fantasies", and found the game to be "cleverly designed, well-plotted, and atmospheric". Kevin Perry of Computer Game Review felt that Strahd's Possession failed to capture the Ravenloft campaign setting, and he described its interface as an exercise in "despair and frustration". He summarized, "Some of [the game's] ideas will help usher along the next generation of CRPGs, but it doesn't." Conversely, the magazine's Ted Chapman called it "a decent enough game" and recommended it to fans of the genre. Computer Gaming Worlds Petra Schlunk approved of the game's "insidiously credible atmosphere". She disliked the real-time magic system, buggy enemy spawning and pathing, and erratic movement speed, and reported frequent crashes, but liked the graphics, sound, dialogue, and character creation system. Schlunk concluded that "Aside from a few technical problems and a somewhat cumbersome interface, Ravenloft is a solid, thoughtfully designed and enjoyable game", not so long as to discourage a replay to finish it again more efficiently.

Strahd's Possession was nominated for Computer Gaming Worlds Role-Playing Game of the Year award in May 1995. The editors remarked that the game's "subject matter and new 3-D look enhance the solid background universe created by TSR's AD&D team".

According to GameSpy, "Ravenloft: Strahd's Possession was a welcome return to form for SSI".

References

External links

1994 video games
DOS games
DreamForge Intertainment games
Dungeons & Dragons video games
FM Towns games
Games commercially released with DOSBox
Gothic video games
Linux games
MacOS games
NEC PC-9801 games
Ravenloft
Role-playing video games
Single-player video games
Strategic Simulations games
Video games developed in the United States
Video games featuring protagonists of selectable gender
Windows games